Dragana Ristova, née Pecevska (born 11 April 1983) is a retired Macedonian handball player who plays for ŽRK Metalurg and for the North Macedonia women's national handball team. 

She plays on the position left wing.

In the season 2009/10 with ŽRK Budućnost she won the EHF Women's Cup Winners' Cup.

References

Living people
1983 births
Macedonian female handball players
Sportspeople from Skopje